The Pludds is a hamlet in the Forest of Dean, Gloucestershire, England. Lydbrook and Joys Green are to the west, Ruardean is to the north, and Ruardean Woodside is to the east. The Pludds has a village hall.

History
The name of the hamlet derives from the Middle English word "pludde" or "plodde", meaning a pool or puddle. The area was known as The Pludds by 1787 when a few houses are reported. One of the oldest surviving houses, Pludds Court, dates from the late 18th or early 19th century. Occasional building continued at the Pludds after 1840 and a beerhouse called the Royal Oak had opened by 1891. In the late 19th and early 20th century there was a coal shaft known as "Pluds" just southwest of the hamlet, which formed part of the Lydbrook Colliery.

The hamlet had shops, a beerhouse, a choral society, and a cricket club, but these had all been closed or been disbanded by 1990. The village hall, built in 1975, continues in use.

References

External links

photos of The Pludds and surrounding area on geograph

Hamlets in Gloucestershire
Forest of Dean